In enzymology, an amylosucrase is an enzyme that catalyzes the chemical reaction

sucrose + (1,4-alpha-D-glucosyl)n  D-fructose + (1,4-alpha-D-glucosyl)n+1

Thus, the two substrates of this enzyme are sucrose and (1,4-alpha-D-glucosyl)n, whereas its two products are D-fructose and (1,4-alpha-D-glucosyl)n+1.

This enzyme belongs to the family of glycosyltransferases, specifically the hexosyltransferases.  The systematic name of this enzyme class is sucrose:1,4-alpha-D-glucan 4-alpha-D-glucosyltransferase. Other names in common use include sucrose-glucan glucosyltransferase, and sucrose-1,4-alpha-glucan glucosyltransferase.  This enzyme participates in starch and sucrose metabolism.

Structural studies

References

 
 
 

EC 2.4.1
Enzymes of known structure